A dog ear is a folded down corner of a book page. The name refers to the ears of many breeds of domestic dog flapping over.  A dog ear can serve as a bookmark. Dog-earing is also commonly used to mark a section or phrase in a book that one finds to be important or of personal meaning. Other names for this practice include page folding and corner turning.  The practice is generally frowned upon by those that want to preserve books in their original condition. It is also sometimes used to keep sheets of paper together, in the absence of a stapler or paper clip.

The phrase dates back at least to the 17th century (in the form "dog's ear"):

Although there is a strong consensus among many readers that dog-eared books are mistreated, there are alternative opinions that favor the practice. Some readers attest to the inconvenience of carrying around a bookmark or keeping them on hand; others describe the practice as evidence of attentive scholarship, deep reading, loving attention to a text.

Dog-ears can range in size from the tip of the page to half the page. Although people generally dog-ear the top section of pages (on either side), some also dog-ear on the bottom half of pages. Dog-ears may be unmade by folding it back into its original location and compressing the pages of the book together. Removing dog-ears is not recommended on paper that has yellowed from age, as it may cause the flap to separate from the page. Dog-earing more than one successive page can cause problems, as the flaps (depending on the thickness of the paper and the number of pages) may cause the marked sections to bulge and distort the book. Reference works are most prone to this problem.

References

Further reading 
 

Book terminology